Madinat ash Shamal is the capital city of the municipality of Al Shamal in Qatar.

Etymology
The city's name "Madinat ash Shamal" translates to "city of the north".

Geography

Madinat ash Shamal is located at a distance of over 100 km of the capital Doha, 27 km away from Zubarah, 24 km away from Fuwayrit, 76 km away from Al Khor, and 122 km away from Al Wakrah.

History
Throughout most of the 20th century, Abu Dhalouf and Ar Ru'ays were the largest villages on the northern coast. In the early 1970s, the Qatari government enacted a plan to establish Madinat ash Shamal between these two villages to serve as an administrative center for the north, in line with its policy of decentralization from the capital of Doha. Throughout the 1970s, a road system and a port were built to connect the three villages. As part of a government housing project, 50 houses had been built in Madinat ash Shamal by 1976. Large-scale development of Madinat ash Shamal continued through the 1980s and 1990s.

Visitor attractions

Situated next to the Al Shamal Municipality headquarters is Madinat ash Shamal Park. One of Qatar's larger parks, it occupies an area of 56,000 square meters. Facilities in the park include a restaurant, café, bathrooms and a children's play area. Water features are present in the park, as well as an irrigation system to sustain its various plants.

Infrastructure
The city's first public library was opened in 1979.

By 1976 the city had its first hospital, with a meager 16 beds. At present, one of the only healthcare centers in the region is hosted by the city.

Sports

Multi-sports club Al Shamal SC is based in the city. They play their home games at Al-Shamal SC Stadium, which is fashioned after a traditional fort.

Administration
When free elections of the Central Municipal Council first took place in Qatar during 1999, Madinat ash Shamal was designated the seat of constituency no. 28. It would remain the headquarters of constituency no. 28 for the next three consecutive elections until the fifth municipal elections in 2015, when it was moved to constituency no. 29 and the seat was shared by Madinat ash Shamal and Ar Ru'ays. Also included in its constituency is Abu Dhalouf, Al Jumail, Zubarah, Ain Mohammed and Al `Arish.

In the inaugural municipal elections in 1999, Saad Ali Al Nuaimi won the elections, receiving 33.3%, or 64 votes. The runner-up candidate was Hussain Ibrahim Al Fadhalah, whose share of the votes was 18.2%, or 35 votes. Voter turnout was 87.7% Al Nuaimi retained his seat in the 2002, 2007 and 2011 elections. In the 2015 elections, Nasser Hassan Al-Kubaisi was elected constituency representative.

Qatar National Master Plan
The Qatar National Master Plan (QNMP) is described as a "spatial representation of the Qatar National Vision 2030". As part of the QNMP's Urban Centre plan, which aims to implement development strategies in 28 central hubs that will serve their surrounding communities, Madinat ash Shamal has been designated a Town Centre, which is the third-highest designation. It is the only Urban Centre in the municipality. 

Al Shamal Town Centre will be located at the midpoint of Madinat ash Shamal and its two neighboring settlements of Abu Dhalouf and Al Ruwais. The plan will focus on upgrading Al Ruwais Port, increasing tourism to the area, and preserving the coastal ecosystem. New mixed-use developments will be constructed to meet the commercial needs of the residents of the aforementioned settlements. Some of the planned buildings include a post office, a 123,965 m² botanical garden, a theme park, a ladies club, a social centre, a new municipal office, and three new schools.

References

Populated places in Al Shamal
Cities in Qatar